Walthamstow station may refer to

 Walthamstow Central station on the London Underground Victoria Line and the National Rail Chingford Branch
 Walthamstow Queen's Road railway station on the London Overground Gospel Oak to Barking Line
 Wood Street railway station on the National Rail Chingford Branch
 St James Street railway station on the National Rail Chingford Branch
 Walthamstow bus station adjacent to Walthamstow Central station